, known by the pen name , is a Japanese manga artist, novelist, essayist, actress, and singer.

Biography 
She was born August 7, 1959 in Nagasaki, Nagasaki Prefecture, Japan. Her father left the family when she and her younger sister were in primary school. Her mother was a dance teacher and bar hostess, who soon began living with another dance instructor, and later remarried. Shungiku was often forced to sleep with her stepfather, and her mother would allow it. One of Shungiku's happiest memories from her childhood was getting a ream of rough paper from her fourth grade teacher, as a gift for saying that her dream was to become a manga artist.

Shungiku dropped out of high school in her second year and worked in restaurants, bars, in a printshop, and as a domestic. Sometimes she slept under bridges. Five years later she left Nagasaki for Tokyo with her beloved manga and $7,000 in savings. She graduated from Nagasaki Prefectural Nagasaki Minami High School. She then attended Keio University, majoring in philosophy in the Department of Literature, but left before completing a degree. Uchida is currently represented by the talent management firm Knockout.

Her representative works include Wakaokusama Tamajigoku and Minami-kun no Koibito (which was later adapted into three drama series). Uchida is also known as "Denko-chan", the mascot character for The Tokyo Electric Power Company.

Besides a career as a manga artist, she is also active with music and as a novelist. She wrote a controversial semi-autobiographical book called "Fatherfucker" which was also made into a live-action movie.

Manga 
 Shiirakansu Brains  (1984)
 Minami-kun no Koibito (南くんの恋人, 1986-1987, published in Garo)
 Nami no Ma Ni Ma Ni (subtitled "An Old-fashioned Love Elegy") (1988)
 Isshinjō no Tsugō ("A Personal Affair") (1988)
 Maboroshi no Futsū Shōjo ("The Illusory Ordinary Girl") (1991)
 Kedarui Yoru ni (1992)
 Monokage ni Ashibyōshi ("Marking Time in the Shadows") (1992)
 Watashitachi wa Hanshoku Shite ("We Are Reproducing") (1994)
 Omae no Kaa-chan Bitch! (1994)

Filmography 

 Akumu Tantei 2 a.k.a. Nightmare Detective 2
 Gumi. Chocolate. Pine (2007)
 Kyacchi boruya (2006)
 Kain no matsuei a.k.a. Cain's Descendant
 Ame no machi a.k.a. The Vanished (2006)
 Yokubo a.k.a. Desire (2006)
 Yumeno (2005)
 Tsuki to Cherry (2004)
 Koi no mon a.k.a. Otakus in Love(2004)
 Mask de 41 (2004)
 Showa Kayo Daizenshu a.k.a. Karaoke Terror (2003)
 Stacy a.k.a. Stacy: Attack of the Schoolgirl Zombies (2001)
 Bijitâ Q a.k.a. Love Cinema Vol. 6 and Visitor Q (2001)
 Kao (2000)

Television 
 Gakko no kaidan G (1998)
 Love Letter (1998)
 Gozonji! Fundoshi zukin (1997)
 Hotaru no yado (1997)
 Skip (1996) (TV)
 Otenki-oneesan (1996)
 Midori (1996)
 Tokiwa-so no seishun (1996)
 Muma (1994)

References

External links 
  Profile at Knockout
 

1959 births
Living people
Japanese actresses
Japanese essayists
20th-century Japanese novelists
Japanese women singers
Women manga artists
Manga artists from Nagasaki Prefecture
People from Nagasaki
Keio University alumni
Japanese female comics artists
Female comics writers
Musicians from Nagasaki Prefecture
Japanese women essayists
Japanese women novelists
20th-century Japanese women writers
20th-century essayists